This is a list of individuals of Palestinian ancestry who grew up and/or live in Germany.

Athletes
 Dani Schahin - football player
 Amir Falahen - football player
 Mayada Al-Sayad - long-distance runner

Musicians
Rapper
 Massiv
  
  
 Sahira

Singer
 Tarééc - R&B 
 Amir-John Haddad - multi-instrumentalist
  - neofolk

Politicians
 Sawsan Chebli

Actors
 Mohamed Issa

Film directors
 Lexi Alexander

Miscellaneous
  - entrepreneur, owner of a record label,  member of a well-known clan
 Malcolm Ohanwe - journalist
 Mouhanad Khorchide -  professor for Islamic theology at the University of Münster.

See also
Lebanese people in Germany (include Libo-Palestinians)
List of Palestinians
Palestinian Diaspora

References

Germany
Palestinian